Arkadi Mikhailovich Sergeev (born 6 February 1986) is a Russian former competitive ice dancer. With Natalia Mikhailova, he is the 2006 World Junior silver medalist.

Career 
Sergeev competed with Natalia Mikhailova on the ISU Junior Grand Prix circuit for six seasons beginning in 2000. They won six gold medals and finished 4th three times at the JGP Final. Mikhailova and Sergeev won silver at the 2006 World Junior Championships. They changed coaches in September 2006, moving from Ksenia Rumiantseva and Petr Durnev to Alexander Zhulin. Mikhailova and Sergeev parted ways at the end of the 2006–07 season – Sergeev had sustained a number of injuries, including rupture of the outer ligaments of the ankle and a fracture, followed by a meniscus problem after he returned to the ice.

Mikhailova and Sergeev teamed up again in 2008 but they retired from competition after finishing 6th at the 2009 Russian Championships.

Competitive highlights 
(with Mikhailova)

Competitive highlights 
GP: Grand Prix; JGP: Junior Grand Prix

 with Mikhailova

References

External links 

 

1986 births
Living people
Russian male ice dancers
Sportspeople from Omsk
World Junior Figure Skating Championships medalists